AXV may refer to:

Neil Armstrong Airport, in Wakaponeta, Ohio, United States (IATA code AXV)
Advanced eXperimental Vehicle, a Toyota concept vehicle
VT-AXV, a plane involved in the Air India Express Flight 812 accident